Rivière-des-Mille-Îles (formerly known as Saint-Eustache—Sainte-Thérèse) is a federal electoral district in Quebec, Canada, that has been represented in the House of Commons of Canada since 1997.

Geography
This riding is located in the northern suburbs of Montreal, on the north shore of the Rivière des Mille-Îles. Since 2003, it has consisted of the cities of Deux-Montagnes, Saint-Eustache and Sainte-Marthe-sur-le-Lac in the Regional County Municipality of Deux-Montagnes; and the City of Boisbriand in the Regional County Municipality of Thérèse-De Blainville.

The neighbouring ridings are Argenteuil—Papineau—Mirabel, Marc-Aurèle-Fortin, Laval, Laval—Les Îles, and Pierrefonds—Dollard.

Demographics
According to the Canada 2011 Census; 2013 representation

Ethnic groups: 94.0% White, 1.4% Black, 1.1% Southeast Asian 
Languages: 85.5% French, 8.2% English, 1.8% Yiddish
Religions: 83.7% Christian (78.4% Catholic, 5.3% Other), 3.1% Jewish, 1.1% Muslim, 12.2% No religion 
Median income (2010): $31,752 
Average income (2010): $39,705

History
It was created in 1996 as "Saint-Eustache—Sainte-Thérèse" riding from parts of Blainville—Deux-Montagnes riding.

It was renamed "Rivière-des-Mille-Îles" in 1998.

This riding lost territory to Mirabel and gained territory from Marc-Aurèle-Fortin during the 2012 electoral redistribution.

Members of Parliament

Election results

Rivière-des-Mille-Îles

	

					

Note: Conservative vote is compared to the total of the Canadian Alliance vote and Progressive Conservative vote in 2000 election.

Saint-Eustache—Sainte-Thérèse

See also
 List of Canadian federal electoral districts
 Past Canadian electoral districts

References

Campaign expense data from Elections Canada
Riding history for Saint-Eustache—Sainte-Thérèse from the Library of Parliament
Riding history for Rivière-des-Mille-Îles from the Library of Parliament
2011 Results from Elections Canada

Notes

Quebec federal electoral districts
Boisbriand
Saint-Eustache, Quebec